Ali Cherri is a Lebanese artist working in video and installation. His varied practice focuses on documenting and presenting heritage and environment in Lebanon and other Middle Eastern countries.

Early life and education
Ali Cherri was born in Beirut. He now works between Beirut and Paris.

Work
Cherri uses found and original footage in single- and multi-channel video installations.

Major exhibitions
Guggenheim New York (2016), Sursock Museum, Beirut (2016), Centquatre, Paris (2016), Sharjah Art Space (2016), MACBA, Spain (2015); Warsaw Museum of Modern Art, Poland (2015); Es Baluard Museu d’Art Modern i Contemporani de Palma, Spain (2015); Gwangju Museum of Art, South Korea (2014); Photography Biennial, Finland (2014); Tate Modern, London, United Kingdom (2013); Home Works 6, Beirut, Lebanon (2013); Berlinale Film Festival, Berlin, Germany (2013); the Toronto International Film Festival, Canada (2012 and 2013); Museum of Modern Art, New York, USA (2012); Centre Georges Pompidou, Paris, France (2011); Contemporary Image Collective, Cairo, Egypt (2009); 52nd Venice Biennial, Italy (2007); Manifesta, Amsterdam, Netherlands (2005); and others.

Ali Cherri (born in Beirut, Lebanon) is a Paris-based filmmaker and visual artist. He holds a BA in Graphic Design from the American University of Beirut and an MA in Performing Arts from the Amsterdam DasArts – Academy of Drama and Dance. Cherri is the recipient of Harvard University’s Robert E.

He received the Fulton Scholarship in 2016, his work has been featured in major exhibitions, including If You Prick Us, Do We Not Bleed? At the National Gallery, London, Milk of Dreams 59th Venice Biennale International Art Exhibition, Minds Rising, Spirits Tuning, 13th Gwangju Biennale, South Korea (2020); Gatekeeper of the Museum of Fine Arts, Marseille - Manifesta 13 , France (2020); Comme un parfum d'aventure in Lyon, France (2020); Phantom limbs in Jameel Art Center, Dubai, United Arab Emirates (2019); but a storm is in New York Solomon R Heaven Blows at the Guggenheim Museum and Gallery of Modern Art in Milan (2018); the statue also dies at the Egizio Museum in Milan (2018); and Somniculus at the Jeu de Paume in Paris and the CAPC Contemporary Art Museum in Bordeaux (2017).                      

His films have been screened at international film festivals including New Director/New Films MoMA NY; Reel Cinemas, Centre Pompidou; CPH:DOX (New Vision Award Winner); Dubai International Film Festival (Best Director Award); VideoBrasil (Southern Panorama Award); Berlin Film Festival; Toronto International Film Festival and San Francisco International Film Festival, etc.

References

External links
 Ali Cherri's Vimeo page
 Ali Cherri's Website

Lebanese artists
1976 births
Living people
Artists from Beirut